Fortune Pharmacal is a Hong Kong pharmaceutical company founded in 1954. The company's products, which are manufactured in Hong Kong, are marketed in Hong Kong, China, Canada, and the United States.

History
The company was founded in 1954 by Lai Yung-kwoon. His son, William Lai Yuen-fai, later took over as CEO.

Production
The company's products are manufactured in Chai Wan. A new factory is scheduled to open in Yuen Long Industrial Estate in 2020.

References

External links
 

1954 establishments in Hong Kong
Hong Kong brands
Pharmaceutical companies of Hong Kong